The Weston Family Foundation (formerly The W. Garfield Weston Foundation) is a Canadian charitable foundation committed to making grants in Canada for the benefit of Canadians. At the end of 2016, the foundation had over $324 million in assets.

History
The foundation was created in the 1950s with donations from W. Garfield Weston (1898–1978), his wife Reta Lila Howard (1897–1967) and all nine of their children – Miriam Burnett, Grainger Weston, Nancy Baron, Barbara Mitchell, Garry Weston, Wendy Rebanks, Gretchen Bauta, Camilla Dalglish and Galen Weston. The foundation was originally named after W. Garfield Weston, who established bakery and other successful enterprises throughout Canada and in other parts of the world. Today, these businesses include George Weston Limited and the Loblaw group of food retailing, processing and distribution companies.

The foundation is supported by an endowment from the extended Weston family, with the majority of the funds being directed to specific organizations in the fields of education and the environment. In 2012, the foundation initiated the Weston Family Parks Challenge, announcing $5 million in funding over 3 years, to enhance Toronto's green spaces while encouraging private-public partnerships for their long-term sustainability. The foundation also supports the Weston Youth Innovation Award at the Ontario Science Centre, with past recipients including Ethan Chan, Adam Noble and Alex Deans.

In addition to its principal ongoing commitments, the foundation makes a number of trustee-initiated grants each year.

See also
 Garfield Weston Foundation (based in the United Kingdom)
 George Weston

References

External links
 

Foundations based in Canada
Foundation